Dan Kovacs (born 1970) is an American competitor in the sport of powerlifting. He currently holds the world record for the IPA raw total at 308 pounds with a total of 2202 pounds.

References

1970 births
Living people
American powerlifters
Place of birth missing (living people)